A skin fissure is a cutaneous condition in which there is a linear-like cleavage of skin, sometimes defined as extending into the dermis. It is smaller than a skin laceration.

Generalized
A skin area on which there are many skin fissures is called cracked skin, and is most commonly a result of skin dryness. Ichthyosis is a genetic disorder where there is often severe skin cracking.

References

Further reading
 Skin Exposures and Effects
 Skin fissure, clinical studies
 Nu Skin (in German)
 Treatment of Skin Fissures

Dermatologic terminology